Amr Mosaad is an Egyptian Paralympic powerlifter. He represented Egypt at the 2016 Summer Paralympics held in Rio de Janeiro, Brazil and he won the silver medal in the men's +107 kg event. He also competed in the men's +107 kg event at the 2020 Summer Paralympics held in Tokyo, Japan.

References

External links 
 

Living people
Year of birth missing (living people)
Place of birth missing (living people)
Powerlifters at the 2016 Summer Paralympics
Powerlifters at the 2020 Summer Paralympics
Medalists at the 2016 Summer Paralympics
Paralympic medalists in powerlifting
Paralympic silver medalists for Egypt
Egyptian male weightlifters
Paralympic powerlifters of Egypt
21st-century Egyptian people